Hélder de Paula Santos commonly known as Hélder (born 20 June 1984) is a Brazilian footballer who plays as a defensive midfielder for Guarani FC.

References

1984 births
Living people
Association football midfielders
Brazilian footballers
Campeonato Brasileiro Série A players
Campeonato Brasileiro Série B players
Coritiba Foot Ball Club players
Sociedade Esportiva Palmeiras players
Clube Atlético do Porto players
Sport Club Corinthians Alagoano players
Club Sportivo Sergipe players
Clube de Regatas Brasil players
Votoraty Futebol Clube players
Esporte Clube Bahia players
Paraná Clube players
Figueirense FC players
Sportspeople from Florianópolis